Robin Anderson and Amandine Hesse were the defending champions but chose not to participate.

Freya Christie and Ali Collins won the title, defeating Weronika Falkowska and Sarah Beth Grey in the final, 1–6, 7–6(7–4), [10–3].

Seeds

Draw

Draw

References

External Links
Main Draw

ITF Féminin Le Neubourg - Doubles